William Nolen Parker (born December 28, 1948) is a former American football center who played for eleven seasons in the National Football League for the San Francisco 49ers, Buffalo Bills and Detroit Lions.

North Texas University
Parker played college football at North Texas University.  While playing at North Texas, Will made All Missouri Valley Conference in 1969 and 1970.  In 2013 Will was voted as the Center for the North Texas All Century Team (1913-2013).  In 2016 the North Texas Hall of Fame committee voted Will into the North Texas Hall of Fame.

San Francisco 49ers
Parker was originally drafted by the San Francisco 49ers in the 1971 NFL Draft, made the Taxi Squad and participated in all practices for the entire season.

Buffalo Bills
Traded to Buffalo in 1973 as a snapper, center and backup guard; playing 8 years for the Bills.  In 1976, going into his fourth year with the Buffalo Bills, Parker became their starting center. Despite a strong middle of the offensive line with Parker flanking left guard Reggie McKenzie and Hall-of-Fame right guard Joe DeLamielleure in all 14 games, that team had a 3-11 won-lost record, the offense scoring only 160 points (11.4 points/game), 26th among 28 teams in the NFL. In 1977 OJ Simpson Buffalo's outstanding running back '77 season in Buffalo was cut short by injury. Before the 1978 season, the Bills traded OJ Simpson to the San Francisco 49ers for a series of draft picks.[18] Willie played three seasons with the team's fortune improving to 5-11 in 1978 and 7-9 in 1979, the first two years with Chuck Knox as the head coach, the same linemen trio up the middle in all 16 games during three years. However, in the following year, Parker was traded to the Detroit Lions to help in rebuilding Detroit's offensive line.

Detroit Lions
In 1980, his final year in the NFL, Parker went to the Detroit Lions, starting only once in 4 games, as a career-ending injury occurred in his final game against the Chicago Bears. Willie came back to the Detroit Lions in 1981 Training Camp and due to work related issue, decided to retire.  In all Willie spent 11 years in the NFL.

References

NFL.com player page

1948 births
Living people
Players of American football from Houston
American football centers
North Texas Mean Green football players
Buffalo Bills players
Detroit Lions players